Stenalia gracilicornis is a beetle in the genus Stenalia of the family Mordellidae. It was described in 1878 by Baudi.

References

gracilicornis
Beetles described in 1878